The 1996 European Curling Championships were held from November 30 to December 7 at the Hvidovre Ice Rink in Copenhagen, Denmark.

Men's

A Tournament

Group A

Group B

B Tournament

Group A

Playoffs

Women's

Group A

Group B

B Tournament

Group A

Playoffs

References

European Curling Championships, 1996
European Curling Championships, 1996
European Curling Championships
European Curling Championships
European Curling Championships
European Curling Championships
International curling competitions hosted by Denmark